The Breeches Lake (in French: Lac Breeches) is located 24 km south of Thetford Mines, in the municipality of Saint-Jacques-le-Majeur-de-Wolfestown. It is located near the head of the rivière au Pin, in the southern watershed of the Bécancour River.

Geography 
The lake is surrounded by 450 hectares of protected land of which "The Wolfe County Hunting and Fishing Club", founded in 1898, largely owns. The shores around the lake are almost entirely natural; only 40 chalets were built there. The lake receives the discharge from Sunday Lake to the south and is bordered to the north by route 263.

References

External links 
 Fish characterization of Lac Breeches
 Other lakes in the Bécancour zone

Arthabaska Regional County Municipality